Léon Guérin (1807–1885) was a French author, poet, and naval historian.

Guérin started writing tales and short stories under his given name, as well as the pen names Guérin-Dulion and Léonide de Mirbel. In 1829, he published Chants Lyriques et Autres Essais Poétiques. He then founded two children's newspapers|newspapers, the Journal des Enfants, and later the Gazette des Enfants et des Jeunes Personnes.

Later in life, Guérin specialised as a historian, and became one of the historiographs of the French Navy in 1846.

Works 
 Chronique du Café de Paris: Le Jeune Homme, 1838
 Les Trois Fils du Capitaine: Voyage dans l'Amérique du Sud et aux Antilles, 1841
 Voyages du Jeune Edmond au-delà du Gange et dans L'Empire Chinois, 1841
 L'Élève de Marine: Voyages dans l'Amérique Septentrionale, 1841
 Le Tour du Monde, ou, Les Mille et Une Merveilles des Voyages, 1842
 Les Voix Naïves: Contes Moraux Destinés à la Jeunesse, 1843
 Histoire Maritime de France, 1844
 Les Marins Illustres de la France, 1845
 Les Jeunes Navigateurs: Autour du Monde, 1845
 L'Europe, Histoire des Nations Européennes, 1846
 Les Navigateurs français: Histoire des Navigations, Découvertes et Colonisations françaises, Paris, 1846
 Histoire de la Marine Contemporaine: Depuis 1784 Jusqu'à 1848, 1855
 Histoire de la Dernière Guerre de Russie (1853–1856) dans la Mer, 1858

External links
 

1807 births
1885 deaths
19th-century French male writers
19th-century French historians
French male non-fiction writers